Little Round Mirrors is a single/EP by Harvey Danger. It was released on Barsuk Records on October 10, 2006.

The single comes from their album Little by Little.... The song is in the key of G♯ and is centered on piano and French horn. The lyrics describe the love of music by the listener, in the form of little round mirrors of CDs, and ultimately the desire to be equally loved by another.

The second track, "Oh! You Pretty Things" is a live cover of a David Bowie song.

"We Drew the Maps" is the first Harvey Danger song not to feature Sean Nelson on lead vocals, instead being sung by Aaron Huffman, the band's bass player who also plays guitar on the track, the bass being played by John Roderick of The Long Winters.

The final two tracks are live recordings of songs from the band's debut album Where Have All The Merrymakers Gone?. They're both very different from the album versions of the songs and feature a greater emphasis on piano.

Track listing
"Little Round Mirrors" – 5:15
"Oh! You Pretty Things [Live] " – 2:47
"We Drew the Maps" – 4:15
"Wrecking Ball [Live]" – 4:21
"Radio Silence [Live]" – 4:20

External links
Harvey Danger's official site

Harvey Danger albums
Albums produced by John Goodmanson
2006 EPs